Cedar Grove is an unincorporated community in Orange County, North Carolina, United States. It is located southeast of McDade, and northwest of Hillsborough.

The Cedar Grove Rural Crossroads Historic District and Capt. John S. Pope Farm are listed on the National Register of Historic Places.

References

Gallery

External links

Unincorporated communities in North Carolina
Unincorporated communities in Orange County, North Carolina